Lin Pei-wun (born 25 November 1999) is a Taiwanese swimmer. She competed at the 2016 Summer Olympics in the Women's 50 m freestyle and finished 49th with a time of 26.41 seconds. She did not advance to the semifinals, which required a top 16 finish in the heats.

In 2019, she represented Chinese Taipei at the 2019 World Aquatics Championships held in Gwangju, South Korea. She competed in the women's 50 metre breaststroke and women's 100 metre breaststroke events. She also competed in the 4 × 100 metre mixed freestyle relay and 4 × 100 metre mixed medley relay events.

References

External links
 

1999 births
Living people
Taiwanese female breaststroke swimmers
Taiwanese female freestyle swimmers
Olympic swimmers of Taiwan
Swimmers at the 2016 Summer Olympics
Place of birth missing (living people)
Swimmers at the 2014 Asian Games
Swimmers at the 2018 Asian Games
Asian Games competitors for Chinese Taipei